The Under 21 Australian Hockey Championships are field hockey tournaments held annually in Australia. The tournament hosts eight teams from around Australia, one from each of the eight states. The event is split into men's and women's tournaments, played usually in the middle of the year.

Competition format
The tournament is divided into two pools, Pool A and Pool B, consisting of four teams in a round robin format. Teams then progress into either Pool C, the medal round, or Pool D, the classification round. Teams carry over points from their previous match ups, and contest teams they are yet to play.

The top two teams in each of pools A and B then progress to Pool C. The top two teams in Pool C continue to contest the Final, while the bottom two teams of Pool C play in the Third and Fourth place match.

The remaining bottom placing teams make up Pool D. The top two teams in Pool D play in the Fifth and Sixth place match, while the bottom two teams of Pool C play in the Seventh and Eighth place match.

Competition rules
Since the 2015 edition of the tournament, games are played under FIH rules, having four 15-minute quarters.

Points system

Finals matches
During finals if games end in a tie, no overtime will be played and the match will go straight to a penalty shoot-out.

Men's tournament

Results
Note: The following summaries comprise results from 2011 onwards, while the tournament was founded earlier.

Team performances

Women's tournament

Results
Note: The following summaries comprise results from 2011 onwards, while the tournament was founded earlier.

Team performances

References

 
Field hockey competitions in Australia
Hockey